was a Japanese jazz and blues singer, lyricist and composer. She was an important voice of the Japanese urban counterculture.

It is written in The Japan Times that she "made her name in 1970" with The World of Maki Asakawa and is known for songs like "Yo ga Aketara" and "Kamome", as well as for the Darkness collections. Conversely, Thom Jurek of AllMusic described her album Blue Spirit Blues (1972) as "perhaps her most memorable recording" and reported that works such as Maki II (1971) and Cat Nap (1982) are well-known. Ben Ratliff wrote, "Some of the most intense recordings she made were English-language covers or Japanese rewrites of American jazz standards, blues songs, and spirituals, backed by only acoustic guitar and drums. (If you can get her 1972 album Blue Spirit Blues, you'll hear this tendency clearest.) She sang slowly, as if there were weights on her."

Biography
Born in Mikawa (now part of the city of Hakusan), Ishikawa Prefecture, after graduating high school she worked as a teller in the local national pensions office before moving to Tokyo. Influenced by the styles of Mahalia Jackson and Billie Holiday, she began her career singing at US Army bases and cabarets.

Asakawa made her debut recording, "Tokyo Banka/Amen Jiro" with Victor in 1967.  After appearing in a series of concerts organized by underground playwright Shuji Terayama in 1968, she signed with Toshiba, now EMI Music Japan, and released the popular songs, 夜が明けたら (Yo ga aketara; At the Break of Dawn) and かもめ (Kamome; Gull) in 1969. Her debut album, 浅川マキの世界 (Asakawa Maki no Sekai; Maki Asakawa's World), was released in 1970.

In addition to writing and composing, she also released cover versions of traditional American folk and blues freely rendered into Japanese, such as "Kimyō na kajitsu (奇妙な果実)" (Strange Fruit), "Asahi no ataru ie (朝日のあたる家)" (The House of the Rising Sun), "Gin House Blues", etc.

She became popular in the 1970s and had more than 30 releases by the end of the 1990s, after which she was mostly known for performing live.

Asakawa collaborated with musicians such as Yosuke Yamashita and Ryuichi Sakamoto. She continued performing live until the time of her death. Scheduled to perform in Nagoya January 15–17, 2010, she died before her show on the 17th, at the age of 67, of heart failure, just 10 days before her 68th birthday.

References

1942 births
2010 deaths
Acid jazz musicians
Blues singer-songwriters
EMI Records artists
Women jazz composers
Japanese women jazz singers
Japanese civil servants
Japanese experimental musicians
Japanese women singer-songwriters
Japanese folk singers
Japanese jazz composers
Japanese lyricists
Japanese women composers
Japanese women writers
Musicians from Ishikawa Prefecture
Psychedelic folk musicians
20th-century Japanese women singers
20th-century Japanese singers
21st-century Japanese women singers
21st-century Japanese singers